That Demon Within (Mo Ging, traditional Chinese character: 魔警) is a 2014 Hong Kong action psychological thriller film directed by Dante Lam and starring Daniel Wu and Nick Cheung. It premiered at the 64th Berlin International Film Festival in February 2014 and also included on the 16 edition of Far East Film Festival in Udine . The film was released on 18 April 2014.

The movie was presented by Dante Lam at the 16th Far East Film Festival 2014 in Udine, Italy with Lam's Unbeatable (2013).

Plot
Reclusive cop Dave Wong (Daniel Wu) unwittingly saves the life of criminal gang leader Hon Kong (Nick Cheung) by donating his blood to him. The gang members hide their faces behind traditional demon masks when committing their violent crimes. During psychotic episodes, Dave experiences his own demons within as he sets out to play off the gang members against each other, resulting in everyone's annihilation. It is then revealed that Dave was brought up by a high expressed emotion father in a socio-economically disadvantaged living environment. He witnessed his father's death inadvertently caused by the responsible policeman who resembled Hon Kong. As a young, innocent soul who had lost his father, he impulsively went on to take revenge, resulting in excessive guilt that predisposed the onset of psychosis later in his life. The event whereby he rescued Hon Kong reminded him of his suppressed memories as a child who had done wrong but trying the hardest to make reparation. Before his inevitable death, there was an opportunity for him to resolve his subconscious intrapersonal conflicts which was to have the courage to fix a mistake done.

Cast
Daniel Wu as Dave Wong
Nick Cheung as Hon Kong / Riot police officer
Christie Chen as Liz Kwok
Andy On as Ben Chan
Liu Kai-chi as Broker
Dominic Lam as Inspector Mok (pops.)
Joseph Lee as Effigy
Stephen Au as MC
Chi Kuan-chun as Dave's father
Ken Wong as Smart Ass
Deep Ng as Kwong
Samuel Leung as Rookie
Lam Tsing as Chanter
Philip Keung as Station Sergeant
Astrid Chan as Stephanie
Fung So-bor as Granny
Wu Ying-man as Private nurse

References

External links

Films directed by Dante Lam
2014 films
2014 action thriller films
2014 psychological thriller films
Hong Kong action thriller films
Hong Kong psychological thriller films
2010s Hong Kong films